Batrachedra hypoxutha is a species of moth of the family Batrachedridae. It is found in Australia.

Original description

References

Batrachedridae
Moths of Australia
Moths described in 1897